The Convention between Italy and Turkey, signed in Ankara on January 4, 1932, by the Italian Plenipotentiary, Ambassador Pompeo Aloisi, and the Turkish foreign minister Tevfik Rüştü Aras, settled a dispute that had arisen in the aftermath of the Treaty of Lausanne of 1923, about the sovereignty over a number of small islets and the delimitation of the territorial waters between the coast of Anatolia and the island of Kastellórizo, which had been an Italian possession since 1921.

Through the convention, the islets situated inside the bay of the harbour of Kastellorizo, along with the islands of Rho and Strongili further off, were assigned to Italy, while all other islets in the surrounding area were assigned to Turkey.

Moreover, the Italian Government recognised the sovereignty of Turkey over the Aegean islet of Kara Ada (Greek: Arcos), situated in front of the town of Bodrum.

In an Appendix signed in December of the same year, the two countries agreed to extend the convention delimiting the sea border between the Anatolian coast and the Italian Dodecanese. This was done by defining thirty five points which were equidistant between Italian and Turkish territory (some are shown in image below). 

The validity of the appendix became a political issue in the context of the Aegean dispute in 1996, after the Imia/Kardak crisis. The Turkish government has rejected it as legally invalid, on the grounds that it was not deposited at the League of Nations in Geneva. This, according to the Turkish view, means that the sovereignty over an unknown number of small islets and rocks in the Dodecanese may be still undefined. However, the validity of the convention itself, with respect to Kara Ada and the Kastellórizo region, is not under dispute.

External links
Text of the convention

History of the Republic of Turkey
20th century in Italy
History of modern Greece
Treaties of Turkey
1932 in Turkey
1932 in Italy
Interwar-period treaties
Treaties concluded in 1932
Treaties of the Kingdom of Italy (1861–1946)
Boundary treaties
Greece–Turkey border
Italy–Turkey relations
Dodecanese under Italian rule